The County of Saarbrücken was an Imperial State in the Upper Lorraine region, with its capital at Saarbrücken. From 1381 it belonged to the Walram branch of the Rhenish House of Nassau.

County of Saarbrücken

Around the year 1080 King Henry IV of Germany vested one Count Siegbert in the Saargau with the Carolingian Kaiserpfalz at Wadgassen on the Saar River and further possessions held by the Bishops of Metz in the Bliesgau as well as in the adjacent Alsace and Palatinate regions as a fiefdom.

In the course of the fierce Investiture Controversy, the rise of the comital dynasty continued with the appointment of Siegbert's son Adalbert as Archbishop of Mainz in 1111, and in 1118 his elder brother Frederick was first mentioned with the title of a "Count of Saarbrücken". However, Frederick's son Simon I had to face the slighting of his Saarbrücken residence by the forces of Emperor Frederick Barbarossa in 1168. Upon his death about 1183, the county was divided into two parts, when the Palatinate territories were separated to form the basis of the County of Zweibrücken. The Alsatian possessions had been lost already around 1120.

When the comital House of Leiningen became extinct in 1212, the Counts of Saarbrücken by jure uxoris inherited their Palatinate possessions around Altleiningen Castle, where they established the younger line of the Counts of Leiningen as a cadet branch. Simon III of Saarbrücken, count from 1207, was a loyal supporter of the Imperial House of Hohenstaufen and of Philip of Swabia. He later joined the Fifth Crusade and, as he had no male heirs, reached the acknowledgement of the inheritance by his daughter Laurette. His younger daughter Mathilda, who succeeded her sister in 1272, managed to secure her right of succession by marrying Count Simon of Commercy who from 1271 called himself Count of Saarbrücken-Commercy.

Saarbrücken received town privileges in 1322. Count John I, vassal of the dukes of Lorraine, joined the Luxembourg king Henry VII of Germany on his campaign to Italy and fought with Henry's son John of Bohemia on the French side in the Hundred Years' War. His grandson, the last Count John II of Saarbrücken, likewise fought with the French in the 1356 Battle of Poitiers, where he and King John II of France were captured and until the 1360 Treaty of Brétigny imprisoned at Wallingford Castle. Vested with the Lordship of Vaucouleurs as well with the title of a Grand Butler of France, he nevertheless had to pawn large parts of his possessions to Archbishop Baldwin of Trier. With John's death in 1381 the male line ended again. As his daughter Johanna had married Count John I of Nassau-Weilburg in 1353, their son Philipp I inherited the County of Saarbrücken.

County of Nassau-Saarbrücken

Philipp I ruled both Nassau-Saarbrücken and Nassau-Weilburg and in 1393 inherited through his wife Johanna of Hohenlohe the lordships Kirchheimbolanden and Stauf.  He also received half of Nassau-Ottweiler in 1393 and other territories later during his reign. After his death in 1429 the territories around Saarbrücken and along the Lahn were kept united until 1442, when they were again divided among his sons into the lines Nassau-Saarbrücken (west of the Rhine) and Nassau-Weilburg (east of the Rhine), the so-called Younger line of Nassau-Weilburg.

In 1507 Count John Ludwig I significantly enlarged his territory by marrying Catharine, the daughter of the last Count of Moers-Saarwerden and in 1527 inherited the County of Saarwerden including the lordship of Lahr. Though after his death in 1544 the county was split into three parts, the three lines (Ottweiler, Saarbrücken proper and Kirchheim) were all extinct in 1574 and all of Nassau-Saarbrücken was united with Nassau-Weilburg until 1629. This new division however was not executed until the Thirty Years' War was over and in 1651 three counties were established: Nassau-Idstein, Nassau-Weilburg and Nassau-Saarbrücken.

Only eight years later, Nassau-Saarbrücken was again divided into:
Nassau-Saarbrücken proper, fell to Nassau-Ottweiler in 1723
Nassau-Ottweiler, fell to Nassau-Usingen in 1728
Nassau-Usingen

By 1728 Nassau-Saarbrücken was united with Nassau-Usingen which had inherited Nassau-Ottweiler and Nassau-Idstein. In 1735 Nassau-Usingen was divided again into Nassau-Usingen and Nassau-Saarbrücken. In 1797 Nassau-Usingen finally inherited Nassau-Saarbrücken, it was (re-)unified with Nassau-Weilburg and raised to the Duchy of Nassau in 1806. The first Duke of Nassau was Frederick August of Nassau-Usingen who died in 1816. Wilhelm, Prince of Nassau-Weilburg inherits the Duchy of Nassau. But, territories of Nassau Saarbrücken was occupied by France in 1793 and was annexed as Sarre department in 1797. Finally County of Nassau-Saarbrücken was part of Prussia in 1814.

The coat of arms combined the lion of the counts of the Saargau with the crosses of the house of Commercy, and was used when the coat of arms of Saarland was created.

Possessions in 1797
 The Principality of Saarbrücken
 County of Ottweiler
 Some villages of the Abbey Wadgassen
 Two-thirds of the County Saarwerden (the bailiwick of Harskirchen, the rest owned by Nassau-Weilburg)

Rulers

House of Leiningen

 1080–1105 Siegbert
 1105–1135 Frederick
 1135–1182 Simon I
 1182–1207 Simon II
 1207–1245 Simon III
 1245–1271 Lauretta
 1271–1274 Mathilde

House of Broyes-Commercy

 1271–1308 Simon IV
 1308–1342 John I
 1342–1381 John II
 1381–1381 Joan

House of Nassau

See also
House of Nassau
Duchy of Nassau
House of Nassau-Weilburg

Sources 

The Dutch Nassau-Saarbrücken and the German Nassau-Saarbrücken Wikipedia articles
The divisions of the House of Nassau chart
Sante, Wilhelm. Geschichte der Deutschen Länder - Territorien-Ploetz. Würzburg 1964.
Köbler, Gerhard. Historisches Lexikon der Deutschen Länder. München 1988.

1797 disestablishments in the Holy Roman Empire
States and territories established in 1381

German noble families
Saarbrücken
Counties of the Holy Roman Empire